Philip Cornelius Hayes (February 3, 1833 – July 13, 1916) was a U.S. Representative from Illinois, as well as an officer in the Union Army during the American Civil War.

Background  
Born in Granby, Connecticut, Hayes moved with his father's family to La Salle County, Illinois. He attended the country schools and graduated from Oberlin (Ohio) College in 1860 and from the Theological Seminary, Oberlin, Ohio, in 1863.

Civil war 
He enlisted in the Union Army during the Civil War and was commissioned as a captain in the 103rd Ohio Infantry on July 16, 1862. He was promoted to lieutenant colonel on November 18, 1864. On December 3, 1867, President Andrew Johnson nominated Hayes for appointment to the grade of brevet brigadier general of volunteers, to rank from March 13, 1865, and the United States Senate confirmed the appointment on February 14, 1868.

Public office and politics 
Following the war, Hayes returned to Ohio. He became the superintendent of schools in Mount Vernon, Ohio, in 1866. He moved to Circleville, Ohio, in 1867, and then to Bryan, Ohio, in 1869.

In 1874, Hayes moved from Ohio to Morris, Illinois. He served as delegate to the Republican National Convention in 1872. Hayes was elected as a Republican to the 45th United States Congress in 1876, unseating independent incumbent Alexander Campbell, a theoretician of the Greenback movement; and was re-elected to the Forty-sixth Congress in 1878. He was not a candidate for renomination in 1880.

He moved to Joliet, Illinois, in 1892, where he resumed journalism. Philip C. Hayes died in Joliet on July 13, 1916, and was interred in Elmhurst Cemetery.

See also

List of American Civil War brevet generals (Union)

Notes

References
 Eicher, John H., and David J. Eicher, Civil War High Commands. Stanford: Stanford University Press, 2001. .
 Retrieved on 2008-08-14

External links

1833 births
1916 deaths
People from Granby, Connecticut
Journalists from Illinois
People of Ohio in the American Civil War
Union Army colonels
Oberlin College alumni
People from Morris, Illinois
People from LaSalle County, Illinois
People from Bryan, Ohio
Republican Party members of the United States House of Representatives from Illinois
19th-century American politicians
Journalists from Ohio
Military personnel from Illinois